On 1 February 2023, a land subsidence event developed in the town of Thathri in the Doda district of Jammu and Kashmir, India, resulting in 23 structures being declared unsafe and approximately 300 people being displaced. The event has been described by geological experts as a multifactor landsliding. Buildings impacted include several houses, a mosque, a religious school for girls, and a cricket academy. , a massive landsliding was reported at Nayi Basti which blocked National Highway 244 for hours.

Incident
In December 2022, residents of the Nayi Basti area of Thathri observed some minor cracks in houses.

In January 2023, Doda district administrators visited the location and reported that the cracks were minor.

On 1 February 2023, The Chenab Times reported that four houses in the area developed cracks, and as of 6 February 2023, 21 houses have been affected.

Residents have reported that about 100 families used to live in the township, most of whom have now been relocated by the district administration to safer locations.

On 9 February 2023, fresh landslides were reported at Nayi Basti Thathri which blocked National Highway 244.

Reactions and responses

The residents of Nayi Basti have demanded that the district administration provide them with alternate lands and relief. On 1 February 2023, The Chenab Times reported that residents of Nayi Basti protested against the local administration for not acting on the issue.

On 3 February 2023, Deputy Commissioner Vishesh Paul Mahajan of Doda reported that the village of Nai Basti experienced significant land subsidence, causing the district government to relocate 19 families to more secure locations. He reported that three houses had already fallen down, and several others had sustained cracks. The district administration also declared a religious school and mosque in the area unsafe.

On 4 February 2023, Lieutenant Governor Manoj Sinha stated that the Jammu and Kashmir administration was closely monitoring approximately twenty structures in Doda that exhibited cracking. However, he denied that the situation is comparable to the land subsidence experienced in Joshimath.

A team of geologists led by G. M. Bhat determined that the Nayi Basti area in Thathri which was assumed to be sinking, is in fact sliding, causing cracks to develop in buildings. Continuous seepage of household water inside the land may be one of the main reasons for subsidence in Nayi Basti, according to Bhat.

References

Chenab Valley
2023 natural disasters
Disasters in Jammu and Kashmir
Subsidences